Jerrick Harding (born April 13, 1998) is an American professional basketball player for Baxi Manresa of the Liga ACB. He played college basketball for the Weber State Wildcats and left as the program's all-time leading scorer.

Early life and high school career
Harding started playing basketball at age two and was also involved in football and soccer in his childhood. He began competing on the Amateur Athletic Union circuit at a late age. Harding played for Wichita Southeast High School in Wichita, Kansas. He did not receive any NCAA Division I offers until his senior season, when he averaged 27.8 points, 4.6 rebounds and 1.7 steals per game, leading his team to a 20–5 record and to the Class 6A state title game. In the state tournament, he averaged 34.3 points per game and his 103 points broke a 37-year-old 6A tournament record. He graduated as his school's all-time leading scorer. Harding was named Kansas Gatorade Player of the Year. On April 22, 2016, he committed to play college basketball for Weber State over an offer from Loyola (Illinois). He was drawn to the program in part because Damian Lillard, one of his favorite players, had played there.

College career
Harding received sparse minutes in his freshman season before working his way into the rotation and had double-digit points in seven straight games to end the season. Harding averaged 9.3 points per game as a freshman at Weber State, even though his coach wanted to redshirt him at first. On March 3, 2018, he scored a school-record 46 points in a 95–92 overtime win over Montana State. As a sophomore, Harding averaged 22 points per game and was named to the First Team All-Big Sky. He finished the season with 682 points, the most by a sophomore in school history. On December 22, 2018, Harding scored a junior season-high 36 points in an 83–69 victory over Delaware State. He averaged 21.4 points per game as a junior and earned First Team All-Big Sky honors for his second straight year. After the season, Harding declared for the 2019 NBA draft, before returning to school. On January 25, 2020, Harding scored 32 points, including nine in overtime, in a 87–85 victory over Montana. He became the third Weber State player to surpass the 2,000 point milestone. On February 6, he scored a senior season-high 44 points and surpassed Jeremy Senglin to become Weber State's all-time leading scorer in a 70–66 win over Sacramento State. As a senior, Harding averaged 22.2 points per game, which ranked seventh among NCAA Division I players, as well as 2.2 assists and 2.9 rebounds per game. He was a Second Team All-Big Sky selection. He finished his career as Weber State's all-time leader in free throw percentage, at 86.8 percent, and scored the third-most points in Big Sky history.

Professional career
On August 4, 2020, Harding signed his first professional contract with Basketball Nymburk of the Czech National Basketball League.

On July 23, 2022, he has signed with Baxi Manresa of the Liga ACB.

Career statistics

College

|-
| style="text-align:left;"| 2016–17
| style="text-align:left;"| Weber State
| 32 || 7 || 17.6 || .497 || .405 || .859 || 1.8 || .8 || .6 || .2 || 9.3
|-
| style="text-align:left;"| 2017–18
| style="text-align:left;"| Weber State
| 31 || 31 || 32.9 || .530 || .425 || .882 || 3.4 || 1.7 || 1.1 || .2 || 22.0
|-
| style="text-align:left;"| 2018–19
| style="text-align:left;"| Weber State
| 30 || 29 || 33.9 || .471 || .366 || .870 || 3.4 || 1.4 || 1.7 || .4 || 21.4
|-
| style="text-align:left;"| 2019–20
| style="text-align:left;"| Weber State
| 29 || 28 || 34.0 || .488 || .328 || .863 || 2.9 || 2.2 || 1.0 || .1 || 22.2
|- class="sortbottom"
| style="text-align:center;" colspan="2"| Career
| 122 || 95 || 29.4 || .497 || .372 || .869 || 2.9 || 1.5 || 1.1 || .2 || 18.6

References

External links
Weber State Wildcats bio

1998 births
Living people
American expatriate basketball people in the Czech Republic
American men's basketball players
Basketball Nymburk players
Basketball players from Wichita, Kansas
Bàsquet Manresa players
Shooting guards
Weber State Wildcats men's basketball players
Wichita Southeast High School alumni